James McDonald (1837 – 12 March 1900) was a 19th-century Member of Parliament in Otago, New Zealand.

References

1837 births
1900 deaths
19th-century New Zealand politicians
Members of the New Zealand House of Representatives
New Zealand MPs for South Island electorates
Unsuccessful candidates in the 1884 New Zealand general election